The 2021 Argentine Torneo Federal A, was the ninth season of the Torneo Federal A, the regionalised third tier of the Argentine football league system. The tournament is reserved for teams indirectly affiliated to the Asociación del Fútbol Argentino (AFA), while teams affiliated to AFA have to play the Primera B Metropolitana, which is the other third tier competition. The competition was contested by 27 of the 31 teams that took part in the 2020 season and four teams promoted from Torneo Regional Federal Amateur. Two teams will be promoted to Primera B Nacional and there was no relegation to Torneo Regional Federal Amateur. The season began on 11 April and ended in December 2021.

Format
The 31 teams were split into two zones, one of 15 teams and another one of 16 teams, where they will play against the other teams in their group twice: once at home and once away, with one team in Zone B having a bye in each round for a total of 30 rounds. Both zone winners will play a final match on neutral ground to decide the first promoted team to the Primera B Nacional for the 2022 season, while the teams placed from second to eighth place in each zone will play a knockout tournament (Torneo Reducido) for the second promotion berth along with the loser of the final between the zone winners, which will join the Reducido in the Second knockout round. No teams will be relegated to Torneo Regional Federal Amateur this season.

Club information

Zone A

Zone B

Resignations
The following teams declined to participate in this season and will return in the next season.

First stage

Zone A

Results

Zone B

Results

First Promotion Final

Deportivo Madryn is promoted to Primera B Nacional.

Second Promotion

First knockout round  
The first knockout round will be contested by 14 teams: the teams ranked from 2nd to 8th place in their groups of the First stage. In this round, the teams will be seeded according to their performance and placements in the previous stage of the competition and paired against a rival according to their seed: Team 1 vs. Team 14, Team 2 vs. Team 13 and so on, playing a single match on local ground. The 7 winners will advance to the second knockout round.

Second knockout round  
The second knockout round will be contested by 8 teams: the 7 winning teams from First knockout round and the losing team from the First Promotion Final. In this round, the 8 teams will be seeded according to their performance and placements in the previous stage of the competition, and paired against a rival according to their seed: Team 1 vs. Team 8, Team 2 vs. Team 7 and so on, playing a single match on neutral ground. The 4 winners will advance to the third knockout round.

Third knockout round  
The third knockout round will be contested by 4 teams: all the 4 winning teams from second knockout round. In this round, the 4 teams will be seeded according to their performance and placements in the previous stage of the competition, and paired against a rival according to their seed: Team 1 vs. Team 4, Team 2 vs. Team 3 and so on, playing a single match on neutral ground. The 2 winners will advance to the fourth knockout round.

Fourth knockout round  
The fourth knockout round will be contested by 2 teams: all the 2 winning teams from third knockout round. In this round, the 2 teams will be seeded according to their performance and placements in the previous stage of the competition, with teams coming from the First Promotion stage being given a higher seed, and paired against a rival according to their seed: Team 1 vs. Team 2, playing a single match on neutral ground. The winner will be promoted to Primera B Nacional.

Chaco For Ever is promoted to Primera B Nacional.

See also
 2021 Copa de la Liga Profesional
 2021 Argentine Primera División
 2021 Primera Nacional
 2021 Primera B Metropolitana
 2019–20 Copa Argentina

References

External links
 Sitio Oficial de AFA   
 Ascenso del Interior  
 Interior Futbolero 
 Solo Ascenso  
 Mundo Ascenso  
 Promiedos  

Torneo Federal A seasons
3